Weingarten is a surname. Notable people with the surname include:

Carl Weingarten, musician and photographer
Gene Weingarten (born 1951), humor writer and journalist
Johnny Wayne (born Louis Weingarten) (1918–1990), Canadian comedian and comedy writer
Joe Weingarten (born 1962), German politician
Julius Weingarten (1836–1910), German mathematician
Lawrence Weingarten (1897–1975), film director
Mordechai Weingarten, Jewish leader in Jerusalem from 1935 to 1948
Paul Weingarten (1886–1948), Moravia-born pianist
Randi Weingarten (born 1957), president of the United Federation of Teachers
Romain Weingarten (born 1926), French writer